Christopher Nicholas Smith (born June 20) is an American television and film actor. He is known for playing Dennis in the 2011 horror movie Paranormal Activity 3. He played Josh Merit in the 2017 romantic comedy film Non-Transferable.

Life and career
Smith was born in Rockville Centre, New York. He starred as Potiphar in the Chaminade High School production of Joseph and the Amazing Technicolor Dreamcoat. He attended the NYU's Tisch School of the Arts and trained at the Atlantic Theater Company Acting School in New York City. Smith is the founder, head writer and principal performer of the sketch comedy troupe Harvard Sailing Team.

Smith's first real acting gig was in a short movie produced by Tisch School of the Arts titled I Killed Zoe Day. He had a small role in the drama, Little Children.

He made his television debut in 2009 in the third-season of 30 Rock in an episode titled "Goodbye, My Friend", where he played Tim. He later joined ESPN's Mayne Street, a web comedy series starring sports journalist Kenny Mayne. He made guest appearances on The Office, The Mindy Project and How I Met Your Mother.

In 2011, he was cast in the Paranormal Activity 3. He was also cast in the political thriller The Reluctant Fundamentalist. In 2013, he appeared in the film Enough Said.

In 2013, he was cast in a CBS television pilot Ex-Men (renamed to We Are Men) which was then picked to series and cancelled after two episodes.

He is also a member of the Harvard Sailing Team Comedy group.

Filmography

References

External links

Year of birth missing (living people)
Living people
21st-century American male actors
American male film actors
American male television actors
People from Rockville Centre, New York
Male actors from New York (state)